Keruyeh may refer to:
 Kenui
 Karuiyeh